Choi Eun-sung (born 5 April 1971) is a South Korean former professional footballer who last played for Jeonbuk Hyundai Motors. He spent 15 seasons as the goalkeeper with Daejeon Citizen.
 
He played for the South Korea national football team and was a participant at the 2002 FIFA World Cup.

He was the first goalkeeper to score in the AFC Champions League, in a match against Monte Carlo on 9 October 2002. Daejeon Citizen went on to win the match 5–1.

In February 2012, just before the 2012 league campaign, Choi requested to extend his contract with Daejeon for one more year, but the board rejected his proposal and he was forced to leave the club and become a free agent. On 23 March 2012, Choi joined Jeonbuk Hyundai Motors on a one-year deal. While at Jeonbuk, Choi sportingly scored an own goal on purpose during a match against Seongnam, after team-mate Lee Dong-gook accidentally scored while attempting to return the ball to Seongnam's goalkeeper; Seongnam won the match 2–1.

Club career statistics

National team
 2001 Confederations Cup
 2002 FIFA World Cup

References

External links
 
 National Team Player Record 
 

1971 births
Living people
Association football goalkeepers
South Korean footballers
South Korea international footballers
Goyang KB Kookmin Bank FC players
Gimcheon Sangmu FC players
Daejeon Hana Citizen FC players
Jeonbuk Hyundai Motors players
K League 1 players
2001 FIFA Confederations Cup players
2002 FIFA World Cup players
Sportspeople from Gyeonggi Province